Simone Le Port (3 July 1920, in Inguiniel – June 2009) was a member of the French Resistance and a peace activist.

Biography
Originally from Inguiniel, Simone Le Port joined the Resistance as a liaison. Her husband Semaphorist became responsible for the air operations bureau of Morbihan (then Loire-Inferieure and Maine-et-Loire). She helped hide illegals, the refractory to the STO and weapons in their farm in Melrand, where they settled after the Lorient fire.

Simone Le Port was arrested after she was denounced on April 16, 1943. She was deported to Ravensbrück Concentration Camp and in April 1945, she was taken by the Germans on a "death march", from which she managed to escape. She reached the American zone on May 8, 1945. When she returned to France, she weighed only thirty-five kilograms.

After the war, she moved to Étel with her husband. She taught about her experiences in schools, and advocated for peace. She died in June 2009, and was buried in Etel.

Awards
    Officier de la Légion d'honneur
    Croix de guerre 1939-1945
    Médaille du combattant volontaire de la Résistance

References

External links

1920 births
2009 deaths
French Resistance members
People from Morbihan